Juan Ernesto Casado (born 15 June 1980) is an Argentine former professional footballer who played as a midfielder. He finished his career after being released from then Primera División de Chile club Rangers.

External links
 
 
 Profile at Futbol XXI  

1980 births
Living people
Argentine footballers
Association football midfielders
Club de Gimnasia y Esgrima La Plata footballers
Club Atlético Vélez Sarsfield footballers
Club Atlético Platense footballers
Club Atlético Belgrano footballers
San Martín de San Juan footballers
Club Atlético Patronato footballers
Tiro Federal footballers
Instituto footballers
Olimpo footballers
Cerro Largo F.C. players
The Strongest players
Patriotas Boyacá footballers
Rangers de Talca footballers
Chilean Primera División players
Argentine Primera División players
Argentine expatriate footballers
Argentine expatriate sportspeople in Chile
Expatriate footballers in Chile
Argentine expatriate sportspeople in Bolivia
Expatriate footballers in Bolivia
Argentine expatriate sportspeople in Uruguay
Expatriate footballers in Uruguay
Argentine expatriate sportspeople in Colombia
Expatriate footballers in Colombia
Footballers from Buenos Aires